Jacob Yoro (born December 8, 1979) is an American football coach who is currently the defensive coordinator and linebackers coach at the University of Hawaii.

Coaching career 
After his playing career ended due to injury, Yoro began coaching at the high school level in Hawaii. He spent 2002 as the linebackers coach at Mililani High School before joining the coaching staff at his alma mater Saint Louis School in 2003 as their linebackers coach. He also spent time coaching at Waipahu High School in 2008 while working at the Pearl Harbor Naval Shipyard.

Upon the completion of his degree in 2008, Yoro went to work in the college ranks, joining the coaching staff at Montana Western as their linebackers coach. While at Montana Western, he lived in the basement of the defensive coordinator's house, sleeping on an air mattress.

Yoro was hired to be the defensive coordinator and linebackers coach at Pacific University in Oregon in 2010. He later added the title of recruiting coordinator in 2011 and assistant head coach in 2014. Yoro departed Pacific in 2015 to take an assistant coaching position at Cal Poly as their defensive backs coach.

Hawaii 
Yoro was hired in 2017 by Hawaii to be their safeties coach. He was reassigned to coaching outside linebackers and nickelbacks in 2018 following the hire of Corey Batoon. He was retained by newly hired head coach Todd Graham in 2020, the first member of his inaugural staff and was promoted to co-defensive coordinator and reassigned to linebackers coach.

Personal life 
A native of Mililani, Hawaii, Yoro attended Saint Louis School in Honolulu, where he was an all-state linebacker. Yoro and his wife Meredith have one daughter.

References

External links 
 Jacob Yoro on Twitter
 Hawaii Rainbow Warriors bio

1979 births
Living people
Sportspeople from Honolulu
American football linebackers
Players of American football from Honolulu
Saint Louis School alumni
Montana Grizzlies football players
High school football coaches in Hawaii
Montana Western Bulldogs football coaches
Pacific Boxers football coaches
Cal Poly Mustangs football coaches
Hawaii Rainbow Warriors football coaches